Preux-au-Bois is a commune in the Nord department in northern France.

Heraldry

Points of interest
Arboretum de l'Étang David
There is a Commonwealth War Graves Commission cemetery just outside of the village with graves from World War I and World War II.
Statue of Louise Thuliez, a French resistance fighter during both World Wars. It was erected in 1970.

See also
Communes of the Nord department

References

Preuxaubois